Habib Bank Limited abbreviated as HBL, is a Pakistani multinational bank based in Habib Bank Plaza, Karachi, Pakistan.

Established in 1941 by the Habib Family, HBL is Pakistan's oldest, largest and the first commercial bank. In 1951 it opened its first international branch in Colombo, Sri Lanka. In 1972 the bank moved its headquarters to the Habib Bank Plaza, which became the tallest building in South Asia at the time. The Government nationalised the bank in 1974 and privatised it in 2004, at that time the Aga Khan Fund for Economic Development acquired a controlling share and the management control.

HBL major shareholding lies with the Aga Khan Fund for Economic Development (AKFED) which is based in Geneva, Switzerland.

HBL is the largest domestic multinational company in Pakistan in terms of assets, and has repeatedly ranked top Pakistani company in the Forbes Global 2000. It is also Pakistan’s largest private sector bank, with over 1700 branches and more than 2000 ATMs. All HBL ATMs are linked to Visa and Mastercard, China UnionPay, and to the domestic 1LINK, MNET, and PayPak switches. IBFT (Interbank Funds Transfer) facility and utility bill payment capability are also provided at HBL ATMs. HBL branches also exchange foreign currency, initiate SWIFT and FEDWIRE transfers, and facilitate RAAST real-time money transfer transactions.

As of 2021, HBL had 21,703 permanent employees and 114 on contract.

History 

Mohammed Ali Jinnah, Pakistan's first Governor General, realised the importance of financial intermediation while he was campaigning for the creation of a separate homeland for the Muslims. He persuaded the Habib family to establish a commercial bank that could serve the Muslim community. His initiative resulted in the creation of Habib Bank in 1941, with head office in Bombay (now Mumbai), and fixed capital of 25,000 rupees. The bank played an important rôle in mobilising funds from the Muslim community to finance the All-India Muslim League's campaign for the establishment of Pakistan. Habib Bank also played an important role in channeling relief funds to Muslims hurt in the communal riots and violence that preceded the departure of the British from British India and the subsequent partition.

After the formation of Pakistan in 1947, Habib Bank moved its headquarters to Karachi, Pakistan's first capital, at the urging of Governor-General Jinnah. This gave Karachi its first commercial bank of the newly formed country.

The Habib family would own and manage the bank until the Pakistan government nationalised it on 1 January 1974.

On 13 June 2002, Pakistan's Privatisation Commission announced that the Government of Pakistan would grant the Aga Khan Fund for Economic Development (AKFED), a subsidiary of the Aga Khan Development Network, majority ownership of HBL against AKFED's investment in the bank.

In 2002, HBL's UK operation came close to being shut down due to regulatory issues with the Financial Services Authority. The issue was resolved by converting the operations to a subsidiary. Then Habib Bank Limited and Allied Bank of Pakistan merged their operations (Habib contributed its six branches and Allied its four branches), into a new bank, called Habib-Allied International Bank, in which Habib Bank has a 90.5% shareholding, while Allied Bank has 9.5%. 	

In December 2003, the Government of Pakistan granted AKFED rights to 51% of the shareholding in the bank against an investment of PKR 22.409 billion (US$389 million). In February 2004, Government of Pakistan handed over management control of Habib Bank to AKFED. The Board of Directors was reconstituted to have four AKFED nominees, including the Chairman and the President/CEO and three Government of Pakistan nominees.

In April 2015, the Government of Pakistan sold its 41.5% stake or 609 million shares in the bank for $1.02 billion. According to the finance ministry, the strike price of Rs. 168 per share (compared to the floor price of Rs. 166 per share) was recommended by the Privatisation Commission Board. The bank's owners now comprise the Aga Khan Fund for Economic Development (51%) and the remaining 49% of shares are in free float. CDC Group holds 4.99% and the International Finance Corporation holds 0.87% while the rest of the shares are held by individuals, institutions and funds.

In June 2015, the bank acquired Barclays's Pakistan operations and absorbed the staff into it.

On 18 April 2016, HBL received a licence to operate a subsidiary in Ürümqi, Xinjiang, becoming the first Pakistani bank to operate in China. It became become the first Pakistani bank and one of three banks from South Asia & MENA Region to open branches in China, with permission to trade in local currency, the Renminbi Yuan (CNY).

In February 2018, HBL appointed senior banker, Muhammad Aurangzeb (formerly CEO Global Corporate Bank – Asia Pacific at JP Morgan) as its President & CEO following early retirement of Nauman K. Dar on 31 December 2017, after the bank was marred by a penalty of $225 Million (USD) for its non-compliance with risk management and anti-money laundering rules.

In 2020, HBL was designated one of the domestic systemically important banks (D-SIB) of the year by the State Bank of Pakistan.

International expansion 
In the 1950s, HBL started its international expansion. In 1951 it opened the first of what would become three branches in Sri Lanka. The next year HBL established Habib Bank (Overseas). Then in 1956 HBL opened the first of five branches in Kenya.

 1957 or 1958 HBL opened a branch in Aden.
 1961 HBL opened the first of what would become six branches in the UK.
 1964 HBL opened the first of four branches in Mauritius and a branch in Beirut.
 1966 HBL opened the first of eight branches in the UAE.
 1967 Hyder Mohamedali Habib founded Habib Bank AG Zurich Zurich. After Pakistan nationalised Habib Bank Ltd in 1974, this became the main branch of the family held Habib Bank.
 1969 HBL opened the first of three branches and an OBU (Offshore Banking Unit) in Bahrain. However, the HBL branch in Aden was nationalised by the then-South Yemeni government.
 1971 HBL opened an OBU in Singapore and a branch in New York City.
 1972 HBL opened the first of 11 branches in Oman. HBL constructed Habib Bank Plaza in Karachi to commemorate the bank's 25th Anniversary.
 1974 The government of Pakistan nationalised HBL and HBL merged with Habib Bank (Overseas). The Habib Family, any of its undertakings, or its affiliates had no stake in HBL after its nationalisation.
 1975 HBL opened a branch in Belgium. HBL also merged with Standard Bank, a Pakistani bank.
 1976 HBL opened a branch in the Seychelles, the first of two branches in Bangladesh, and a branch in the Maldives.
 1979 HBL opened a branch in the Netherlands.
 1980 HBL opened a branch in Paris and another in Hong Kong.
 1981 HBL established Nigeria Habib Bank with 40% ownership. HBL also opened a representative office in Tehran.
 1982 HBL opened a branch in Khartoum.
 1983 HBL opened a branch in the Karachi EPZ (Export Processing Zone) and a branch in Istanbul.	
 1987 HBL opened a branch in Australia.
 1991 The Habib Group established a separate private bank, the Bank AL Habib, after private banking was re-established in Pakistan. HBL opened a branch in the Fiji Islands, and took over the branches in Pakistan of the failed, BCCI.
 1992 In Nepal HBL acquired 20% of Himalayan Bank.	
 1995 HBL established a representative office in Cairo.
 1990s HBL established Habib Finance (Australia), and Habib Finance International Limited, Hong Kong.
 2002 The Government of Pakistan granted the Aga Khan Fund for Economic Development majority ownership of HBL.
 2017 HBL opened a branch in China at Ürümqi High-tech Industrial Development Zone.
2021 HBL became the first Pakistani bank to open a branch and serve clients in Beijing, China.

DFS Investigation 

In September 2017, HBL agreed to pay a fine of $225 million in an out of court settlement with the New York State Department of Financial Services (DFS) against 53 separate violations allegedly committed between 2007 and 2017.

Following which the shares of HBL surged 5 percent, to ₨.160.58 per share, amid investor relief that the fine was not larger than $225 million. The penalty, however, is the largest ever imposed upon a Pakistani financial institution. HBL had already agreed to surrender its license to operate a branch in New York that has been operational since 1978.

The DFS had earlier sought up to $630m in penalties from HBL for failing to comply with state and federal laws at its only U.S. branch. According to The Nation, compliance issues dated back to 2015 when the DFS told Karachi-listed Habib Bank (HBL) to institute a series of reforms pertaining to the bank's policies for preventing illicit money transfers. In a December 2015 statement, the DFS stated it identified issues in the bank's anti-money laundering compliance.

Habib also allegedly cleared transactions to a cybercriminal wanted by the US Federal Bureau of Investigation and a Chinese weapons manufacturer that was subject to US sanctions. Since Habib's New York operations were used to clear dollar-denominated transactions, the bank is required to follow US "know your customer" rules and sanctions law.

Allegations of terror financing
On 28 September 2022, a New York district court passed an order under the Justice Against Sponsors of Terrorism Act placing secondary liability on Habib Bank Limited as a party that "aids and abets, by knowingly providing substantial assistance, or who conspires with the person who committed such an act of international terrorism". The plaintiff claimed that between 2010 and 2019, the bank had aided and abetted Al-Qaeda terrorism and had participated in a conspiracy to launch attacks in Afghanistan that killed or injured 370 people. In response, HBL released a statement claiming the accusations were "meritless" and that the bank was fiercely and thoroughly contesting them.

FinCEN 
HBL was named in FinCEN leak, published by Buzzfeed News and the International Consortium of Investigative Journalists (ICIJ). It had one suspicious transaction flagged.

Products and Services

Debit Cards

Credit Cards

HBL Nisa

HBL Prestige

HBL Mahana Amdan

HBL Rutba

ebanc Roshan Digital Account

HBL Haryali Account

Digital Account Opening

HBL Asset Management Limited 
HBL got State Bank of Pakistan (SBP) approval to inject Rs500mn in its wholly owned subsidiary namely HBL Asset Management Limited.

Financial Performance 

Sponsorship 
HBL has also served as the title sponsor of the Pakistan Super League (PSL), since the league's first edition in 2016. In November 2021, the sponsorship deal was renewed for another four-year cycle until 2025.

See also 
List of largest companies in Pakistan

 Economy of Pakistan
 Habib Bank Plaza
 List of Banks in Pakistan

References

External links 
 Habib Bank
 hblibank – Habib Bank's Internet Banking Website 
 HBL Got Bank of the Year Award – 2009
 HABIB BANK LTD. v. HABIB BANK A.G. ZURICH – 1980/82
 HBL Data Breach
 Pakistani Hacker Cracks Pakistan’s Biggest Bank

Banks established in 1940
Banks of Pakistan
Companies based in Karachi
Pakistani brands
1940 establishments in British India
Multinational companies headquartered in Pakistan
Companies listed on the Pakistan Stock Exchange
Formerly government-owned companies of Pakistan
Banks of Bangladesh with Islamic banking services
Pakistani subsidiaries of foreign companies